Gražulis is a Lithuanian language family name. It may refer to:
Andrejs Gražulis, Latvian basketballer
Thomas P. Grazulis, American meteorologist
Petras Gražulis, Lithuanian politician, MP

 
 
Lithuanian-language surnames